Kim Putters (born September 22, 1973 in Hardinxveld-Giessendam) is a Dutch public administrator, former politician and administrator. He was professor of Health Care Policy and Steering at Erasmus University Rotterdam until 2022, since 2022 he has been professor of Broad Welfare at Tilburg University. From 2003 to 15 June 2013 he was a Member of the Dutch Senate for the Labor Party. Since his retirement from the Dutch Senate, he was director of The Netherlands Institute for Social Research (SCP) until June 2022. Since September 16, 2022, he has been chairman of the Social and Economic Council (SER).

Political career

Dutch Senate
Putters served as a member of the Dutch Senate from 2003 to 11 june 2013. From 2011 until his departure in 2013, Putters served as the First Vice President of the Senate. He also served as deputy leader of the PvdA in the Upper House. In the Senate, he focused on science policy and higher education, public housing and spatial planning, and public health, welfare and sport.

From 2011 to 2013, he also chaired the Dutch parliamentarian delegation in the Inter-Parliamentary Union (IPU). In the municipality of Hardinxveld-Giessendam, he acted as a council member, party leader and formateur between 2002 and 2012.

Netherlands Institute for Social Research (SCP)
Putters served as director of the Netherlands Institute for Social Research (SCP) from 2013 to 2022. In that role, he directed the SCP and advised cabinet and parliament on the social issues of our time, putting them in a broader societal context.

Social and Economic Council
Kim Putters has been a Crown-appointed member of the Social and Economic Council (SER) since January 2017 for his role as director of the Netherlands Institute for Social Research (SCP). On 17 June 2022, the Council of Ministers (Netherlands) approved the appointment of Prof. Kim Putters (1973) as president of the Social and Economic Council of the Netherlands (SER). He succeeded Mariëtte Hamer, who had been appointed by the government of Prime Minister Mark Rutte as commissioner for combating inappropriate behavior and sexual violence, a new role in which she is tasked with coming up with a plan to tackle sexually inappropriate behavior and sexual violence.

Putters is also a member of the Advisory Board of the Dutch National Youth Council, member of the National Committee for 4 and 5 May (since 2019) and vice-president of the social welfare foundation Oranje Fonds (since October 2016).

References

Chairmen of the Social and Economic Council
Members of the Social and Economic Council
Labour Party (Netherlands) politicians
21st-century Dutch politicians
1973 births
Living people